Harry Ahlin (14 April 1900 – 31 July 1969) was a Swedish film actor. He appeared in 60 films between 1919 and 1969.  He was also the grandfather of actor/television producer Anton Glanzelius.

Selected filmography

 Ingmar's Inheritance (1925)
 The Triumph of the Heart (1929)
 Frida's Songs (1930)
 The People of Norrland (1930)
 Tired Theodore (1931)
 The Dangerous Game (1933)
 Boman's Boy (1933)
 The Yellow Clinic (1942)
 Young Blood (1943)
 Katrina (1943)
 She Thought It Was Him (1943)
 Blizzard (1944)
 We Need Each Other (1944)
 Black Roses (1945)
 The Bells of the Old Town (1946)
 Dynamite (1947)
 Neglected by His Wife (1947)
 Port of Call (1948)
 The Swedish Horseman (1949)
 Realm of Man (1949)
 In the Arms of the Sea (1951)
 Skipper in Stormy Weather (1951)
 Customs Officer Bom (1951)
 Blondie, Beef and the Banana (1952)
 Young Summer (1954)
 Flicka i kasern (1955)
 The Light from Lund (1955)
 Paradise (1955)
 When the Mills are Running (1956)
 Rififi in Stockholm (1961)
 The Shot (1969)

References

External links

1900 births
1969 deaths
People from Sundsvall
Swedish male film actors
20th-century Swedish male actors